The St. Lawrence Saints represent St. Lawrence University in ECAC women's ice hockey during the 2017–18 NCAA Division I women's ice hockey season. In the off-season, Kennedy Marchment was drafted by the Buffalo Beauts as the second overall pick in the NWHL draft.

Recruiting

2017–18 Saints

Standings

2017-18 Schedule

|-
!colspan=12 style=";"| Regular Season

Awards and honors

References

St. Lawrence
St. Lawrence Saints women's ice hockey seasons